Yogi Rahadian (born 27 October 1995 in Palembang, South Sumatra) is an Indonesian professional footballer who plays as a winger for Liga 2 club Sriwijaya.

Career
In 2011, he had a four-month trial with Leicester City.

He played for Deportivo Indonesia before joining Mitra Kukar youth team in 2013. He was part of the team that achieved second place in the 2012–13 Indonesia Super League U-21.

Honours

Club 
Mitra Kukar
 General Sudirman Cup: 2015

References

External links
 
 Yogi Rahadian at Liga Indonesia

1995 births
Association football midfielders
Living people
Indonesian footballers
Liga 1 (Indonesia) players
Badak Lampung F.C. players
Mitra Kukar players
Persija Jakarta players
Sriwijaya F.C. players
People from Palembang
Indonesia youth international footballers